Wushan Square (Chinese: 吴山广场) is the west terminus of Line 7 of the Hangzhou Metro in China. It is located in the Shangcheng District of Hangzhou. The station opened on April 1, 2022 after five years of construction.

References 

Railway stations in Zhejiang
Hangzhou Metro stations